A power concrete screed is a tool used to smooth and level freshly poured concrete surfaces. It can be used in place of a man powered screed bar to strike off the excess concrete.

In concrete, prior to the mix drying, the concrete should be smoothed out on the desired surface. A power screed assists in the smoothing out process by leveling out and/or vibrating the wet mixture.  There are friction screeds or "roller" screeds that level the concrete which can be powered by gas, electricity or hydraulics.  The compaction performance of the power concrete screed is mainly determined by the centrifugal force of the vibration force and only to a minor extent by the static weight.

Concrete